Virginia Heffernan (born August 8, 1969) is an American journalist and cultural critic. Since 2015, she has been a political columnist at the Los Angeles Times and a cultural columnist at Wired. From 2003 to 2011, she worked as a staff writer for The New York Times, first as a television critic, then as a magazine columnist, and then as an opinion writer. She has also worked as a senior editor for Harper's, as a founding editor of Talk, and as a TV critic for Slate. Her 2016 book Magic and Loss: The Internet as Art argued that the Internet is a "massive and collective work of art", one that is a "work in progress", and that the suggested deterioration of attention spans in response to it is a myth.

Early life and education
Virginia Heffernan was born in Hanover, New Hampshire. She graduated summa cum laude from the University of Virginia (1991). She also received an English Literature Master's Degree (1993) and Ph.D (2002) from Harvard University.

Career

Journalism
Heffernan began her career as a fact checker with The New Yorker magazine. She served as a senior editor at Harper's and founding editor of Talk magazines, and as television critic for the online magazine Slate.

In June 2002, the Columbia Journalism Review named Heffernan one of its "Ten Young Editors to Watch". In September of the following year, Heffernan departed Slate to join The New York Times. While there, she started the blog "Screens" for the New York Times website, which eventually became "The Medium" blog (named after her column).

In February 2012, she became a national correspondent for Yahoo News, where she covered the 2012 presidential election and wrote about subjects related to media, technology, politics and culture. In June 2013, Heffernan began a series of articles for Yahoo News, entitled "Glass Menagerie", on her experiences using Google Glass OHMD.

Heffernan is a regular contributor to The New York Times, as well as The Wall Street Journal, Wired, Mother Jones, Politico, and many other publications.

In her journalism, Heffernan writes about culture and technology using methods of literary criticism. Her work often centers on the human side of technology, and culture in general, and she advocates broader and more critical thinking with regard to newer technologies.

In parallel to writing on the subject, Heffernan also participates actively in social media. She openly befriends her readers on Facebook, tweets frequently and maintains an active Tumblr.

In July 2013, Heffernan published an article entitled "Why I'm a creationist", saying she was "considerably less amused and moved by the character-free Big Bang story ("something exploded") than by the twisted and picturesque misadventures of Eve and Adam". She concluded by quoting author Yann Martel's summation of his novel, Life of Pi: "1) Life is a story, 2) You can choose your story, 3) A story with God is the better story". In a subsequent discussion on Twitter with the popular science writer Carl Zimmer, Heffernan clarified her stance — "I'm a creationist on aesthetic grounds". Heffernan received much criticism for her column. Critics responded to her postmodern stance, several quoting Daniel Patrick Moynihan: "Everyone is entitled to his own opinion, but not to his own facts".  However, writing in The Guardian, Andrew Brown dismissed Heffernan's critique of evolution, but noted that: "[s]he is certainly not a young-earth creationist ... [b]ut she wants stories where people find hope and courage in the events of the world around them, and she finds them in religion, not in science".

In 2014 Ben Yagoda in the Chronicle of Higher Education named her among his top candidates for "best living writer of English prose".

On February 5, 2021, Heffernan published an opinion piece in the Los Angeles Times entitled "What can you do about the Trumpites next door?" in which she wondered, self-critically, how to respond to kindness from rightwing neighbors. Heffernan received criticism from right-wing pundits like Tucker Carlson and Megyn Kelley.

Podcasts
From October 2018, Heffernan was the host of Slate's Trumpcast podcast. In it, she evaluated and critiqued the presidency of Donald Trump, interviewing guests like Yascha Mounk, Fareed Zakaria, David Corn and more. On January 30, 2021, the final episode was released.

In April 2021, Heffernan began a new podcast, After Trump with Lawfare (blog) following on from her work on Trumpcast.

Books and TV
Heffernan has contributed to a number of books, covering topics that include depression, TV series and the impact of the internet.

In 2005, Heffernan (with co-writer Mike Albo) published the comic novel, The Underminer. The MTV documentary on the murder of Matthew Shepard, Matthew's Murder—for which Heffernan wrote the script—was nominated for an Emmy award.

Magic and Loss
Heffernan has been online since the age of ten, when she used a Zenith computer terminal and dial-up modem at home to play a MUD at Dartmouth College. Her book about digital culture, Magic and Loss: The Internet As Art (Simon & Schuster) was published in June 2016. In this, Heffernan argued that the Internet is "the great masterpiece of civilization, a massive and collective work of art". The book was well-received, earning a starred Kirkus review, and showing up on summer reading lists, including those of Gwyneth Paltrow and Lenny Letter. Paltrow called Heffernan, "One of the writers I most admire", The New York Review of Books called it "an ecstatic narrative of submission", and The Wall Street Journal described it as "An illuminating guide to the internet". Writing in The New Yorker, Louis Menand wrote that "Heffernan is smart, her writing has flair, she can refer intelligently to Barthes, Derrida, and Benjamin—also to Aquinas, Dante, and Proust—and she knows a lot about the Internet and its history. She is good company."

Bibliography

Books 
 
 
 
 
 
 
 Heffernan, Virginia (2016). Magic and Loss: The Internet as Art. .

Essays and reporting

Theses

References

External links
 VPHeffernan.com
 Virginia Heffernan Interview on Media Bistro
 Virginia Heffernan Archive, The New York Times
 Virginia Heffernan Archive, Slate Magazine

1969 births
Living people
20th-century American non-fiction writers
20th-century American women writers
21st-century American non-fiction writers
21st-century American women writers
American podcasters
American television critics
American women columnists
American women critics
American women podcasters
Critics employed by The New York Times
Harvard University alumni
The New York Times columnists
People from Hanover, New Hampshire
University of Virginia alumni
Wired (magazine) people
Writers from New Hampshire